The Sexual Minorities Archives is one of the longest continually operating archives of LGBT material in the United States, which holds the Leslie Feinberg Library, a collection of the late writer's personal research materials. The physical archive is located in a large converted Victorian home in Holyoke, Massachusetts, as of 2017. It was located in the home of curator Ben Power in Northampton, Massachusetts, from 1979 to 2017. It was founded in Chicago in 1974 by a lesbian-feminist organization known as the New Alexandria Lesbian Library.

Collection 
The archive includes three types of materials related to literature, history, and art. The Literature collection "spans more than a century and includes LGBTQI books (fiction and non-fiction), pulp paperbacks, reference books, over 1,000 periodical titles with 17,000 individual issues, and more." The History collection "ranges from the mid-19th century and ... includes subject files, multimedia, personal papers, organizational collections, speeches, correspondence, ephemera, political and sociocultural buttons, and more." The Art collection "includes original LGBTQI paintings and drawings, posters, banners, photography, sculpture, textiles, and music."

As of 2017, collection materials can be freely searched and viewed online through the Digital Transgender Archive, the largest digital archive of transgender materials in the world.

References

External links 
 Sexual Minorities Archive official website
 Sexual Minorities Archive on Digital Transgender Archive

LGBT museums and archives
Museums in Hampden County, Massachusetts
Organizations based in Holyoke, Massachusetts
LGBT organizations in the United States
LGBT culture in Massachusetts